

Fixtures

Match 1

Match 5

Match 15

Match 21

Match 24

Match 26

Match 29

Match 33

Match 36

Match 42

Match 44

Match 48

Match 53

Ladder

References

External links
 Official website of the Brisbane Heat
 Official website of the Big Bash League

Brisbane Heat seasons